Ronald Blanchard (born 1945) is an Australian stage, television and film actor. He is best known as a character actor, and for his starring roles in five popular children's television series Breakfast-a-Go-Go, The Lost Islands, Alexander Bunyip's Billabong, Watch This Space and Professor Poopsnagle's Steam Zeppelin. A well-known character actor, Blanchard had numerous appearances on television series and films from the late 1960s up until the late 1990s, most especially, his recurring guest role as Lenny Sawyer on A Country Practice but has since returned to theatre work. He made his film debut in a supporting role in Caddie in 1976 and appeared in the 1997 film Oscar and Lucinda.

Biography
Blanchard got his first big break on the small screen when he appeared on the children's variety show Breakfast-a-Go-Go in 1969 as "Witless Wonder", the comedic sidekick of new host Sue Smith. In 1972 he appeared as a guest star on the soap opera Number 96 and on the comedy series Snake Gully with Dad and Dave. He continued working on-and-off for the next several years and, in 1976, Blanchard landed the part of the villainous Quell on the children's adventure series The Lost Islands. As one of the show's main antagonists, the series provided his breakout role.

As well as appearing on The Outsiders, in the same year he also made his film debut with a supporting role in Caddie. He followed this with appearances on The Garry McDonald Show (1977), Alexander Bunyip's Billabong (1978), Doctor Down Under (1979) and, most notably, co-starring with Paul Chubb in the children's science fiction series Watch This Space (1982). He began to work more regularly during the early 1980s and had parts in the television movie Chase Through the Night (1983), television miniseries The Last Bastion (1984)  and films Silver City (1984), Warming Up (1985) and Burke & Wills (1985).

In January 1986, he joined former co-star Paul Chubb and Perry Quinton in a children's pantomime called Humpty Dumpty. It featured the fictional characters of the Harry and Ralph Show at the Footbridge Theatre. In the same year, he starred in yet another children's television series, the popular but short-lived Professor Poopsnagle's Steam Zeppelin. After a supporting role in the thriller film Dark Age (1987), he returned to television acting with guest appearances in Mother and Son (1988), True Believers (1988) and G.P. (1991). That same year, he also had a minor role in the action film Gotcha (1991).

Beginning in 1992, Blanchard had a recurring role as Lenny Sawyer on the television series A Country Practice. His last regular acting role was in the film Country Life (1994), although he made appearances in the television movie Hart to Hart: Harts in High Season (1996) and the romance film Oscar and Lucinda (1997).

For the past 12 years, he has been travelling the world playing the role of an English butler for the famous Swedish illusionist Joe Labero.

Selected filmography

References

External links

1945 births
Living people
Australian male television actors